The  is a Japanese women's football team which plays Nadeshiko League Division 2 from the 2021 season.

Results

See also
List of women's football clubs in Japan

References

External links
Official site 

Women's football clubs in Japan